Aiguilles Island is an uninhabited island just northeast of Great Barrier Island in the Auckland Region of New Zealand.

See also

 List of islands of New Zealand
 List of islands
 Desert island

References

External links
Rodent Invasion Project
Aiguilles Island Community Profile

Uninhabited islands of New Zealand
Islands of the Auckland Region
Hauraki Gulf
Islands of the Hauraki Gulf